Čechy pod Kosířem is a municipality and village in Prostějov District in the Olomouc Region of the Czech Republic. It has about 1,000 inhabitants.

Geography
It lies in the Zábřeh Highlands. It is situated the foot of the Velký Kosíř hill, the top of which is located just outside the municipal territory.

History
The first written mention of Čechy pod Kosířem is in a deed of Bishop Jindřich Zdík from 1141. The most notable owners was the Silva-Tarouca noble family, which owned the manor with the castle from 1768 until 1945.

Sights

The municipality is known for the Čechy pod Kosířem Castle. The original castle was built here in the 16th century. After it fell into disrepair, it was reconstructed in the 1820s. The today's appearance is from 1839–1846, when it was  rebuilt in the Neoclassical, so-called "modernized Italian" style. Today there are several exhibitions of the Regional Museum in Olomouc.

Even more important than the castle building is the castle park. It was founded in the 1820–1830s. It was adapted as a landscape area with a network of canals, footpaths and small architectural structures. Later, a brick tower with a battlement and a garden pavilion were added. The pavilion served the painter Josef Mánes as a studio, which visited the castle for more than twenty years and created his masterpieces. At the time of August Alexander Silva-Tarouca, today's terrain modeling of the park was created, including two ponds, and in 1853 an orangery was built next to the castle.

Notable people
Bedřich Silva-Tarouca (1816–1881), Catholic priest and nobleman
Josef Mánes (1820–1871), painter; worked here
Hugo Schenk (1849–1884), Austrian serial killer

Gallery

References

External links

Villages in Prostějov District